Antonio Candela (born 27 April 2000) is an Italian professional footballer who plays as defender for  club Venezia.

Career
On 5 August 2017, Candela made his professional debut with Spezia Calcio against Serie C club Reggiana in the Coppa Italia.

On 31 July 2019, Candela joined Serie B club Trapani on loan until 30 June 2020. On 31 January 2020, he moved on loan to Serie C club Olbia.

On 3 September 2020 he moved on loan to Pergolettese. On 24 July 2021, he was loaned to Cesena.

On 25 August 2022, Genoa and Venezia reached an agreement under which Candela and cash moved to Venezia in exchange for Mattia Aramu moving in the opposite direction. Candela signed a three-year agreement with Venezia, with an option to extend.

Honours
Italy U19
UEFA European Under-19 Championship runner-up: 2018

Italy U20
FIFA U-20 World Cup fourth place: 2019

References

2000 births
Living people
People from La Spezia
Footballers from Liguria
Italian footballers
Association football defenders
Serie B players
Serie C players
Spezia Calcio players
Genoa C.F.C. players
Trapani Calcio players
Olbia Calcio 1905 players
U.S. Pergolettese 1932 players
Cesena F.C. players
Venezia F.C. players
Italy youth international footballers
Sportspeople from the Province of La Spezia